Brazilian Romance is a 1987 studio album by Sarah Vaughan.

This was Vaughan's last album, though she later contributed to Quincy Jones' 1989 Back on the Block. Brazilian Romance was Vaughan's third album of Brazilian music, following Copacabana (1979) and I Love Brazil! (1977)

Vaughan was nominated for the Grammy Award for Best Jazz Vocal Performance, Female at the 30th Annual Grammy Awards for her performance on this album.

Track listing 
 "Make This City Ours Tonight" ("Cançâo do sal") (Tracy Mann, Milton Nascimento) - 2:57
 "Romance" (Danilo Caymmi, Mann, Paulo César Pinheiro) - 3:30
 "Love and Passion"  ("Amor e Paixão") (Mann, Nascimento) - 3:58
 "So Many Stars" (Marilyn Bergman, Alan Bergman, Sérgio Mendes) - 4:07
 "Photograph" ("Tati, a Garota") (Dori Caymmi, Mann, Paulo César Pinheiro) - 2:31
 "Nothing Will Be as It Was" ("Nada Será Como Antes)" (Ronaldo Bastos, Nascimento, René Vicent) - 4:44
 "It's Simple" (Caymmi, Mann, Pinheiro) - 2:58
 "Obsession" (Caymmi, Mann, Gilson Peranzzetta) - 3:09
 "Wanting More" ("O que se Sabe da Cor") (Fernando Leporace, Mann) - 3:54
 "Your Smile" 	("Estrela da Terra") (Caymmi, Pinheiro, Wolf) - 3:08

Personnel 
 Sarah Vaughan - vocal
 Milton Nascimento - vocals
 George Duke - keyboard
 Alphonso Johnson - bass
 Dann Huff - guitar
 Dori Caymmi - guitar, arranger
 Carlos Vega - drums
 Paulinho da Costa - percussion
 Hubert Laws - flute solo on "Obsession"
 Tom Scott - lyricon solo on "Love and Passion", tenor saxophone solo on "Make This City Ours Tonight"
 Ernie Watts - alto saxophone solo on "Nothing Will Be as It Was"
 Marcio Montarroyos - flugelhorn solo on "Romance", trumpet solo on "Make This City Ours Tonight"
 Chuck Domanico - acoustic bass on "Photograph"
 Siedah Garrett - background vocal on "Your Smile"
 Gracinha Leporace - background vocal on "Your Smile"
 Kate Markowitz - background vocal on "Your Smile"
 Gordon Marron - violin
 Barry Socher
 Wilbert Nuttycombe
 Robert Sanov
 Jay Rosen
 Shari Zippert
 Ronald Folson
 Irving Geller
 Jean Hugo
 Connie Kupka
 Arthur Zadinsky
 Bill Hybel
 Marilyn Graham
 Joseph Goodman
 R. Hill
 Kenneth Burward-Hoy - viola
 Gareth Nuttycombe
 Marilyn H. Baker
 Herschel Wise
 Suzie Katayama - cello
 Larry Corbett
 David Speltz
 Todd Hemenway
 Gayle Levant - harp

References 

1987 albums
Sarah Vaughan albums
Albums produced by Sérgio Mendes
Columbia Records albums
Bossa nova albums